Javelin fish, javelinfish, or javelin, may refer to several fishes:

Primarily
 Coelorinchus australis, the javelin fish, javelinfish, a species of fish found around Australia and New Zealand 
 Thorntooth grenadier (Lepidorhynchus denticulatus), the javelin fish, a species of fish found around Australia and New Zealand 
 Lighthouse lizardfish (Synodus jaculum), the javelinfish, a species of lizardfish that lives mainly in the Indo-Pacific

Other fish
 Bathylychnops exilis, the javelin spookfish, a species of barreleye found in the northern Pacific and in the eastern Atlantic Ocean near the Azores
 Dipturus doutrei, the javelin skate; see List of data deficient fishes
 Pomadasys kaakan, the javelin grunter, a species of marine ray-finned fish found in the Indian and Pacific
 , the javelin goby; see List of freshwater fishes of Korea

See also

  Search for javelin+fish
 Javelin (disambiguation)